Bostan (بوستان) is a town, 30 km by road (18.64 mi) from Quetta city in the Balochistan province of Pakistan.It is located at 30°25'57N 67°00'22E and has an altitude of 1593 metres (5229 feet). Bostan is Tehsil of the Pishin District. It was previously included in Tehsil Karezat  and covers an area between Mount Takathu and the Red Hills (Bostan clay).

History 
This region was named after Bostan, who was great tribal leader and head of the Panezai clan of the Kakar tribe. Bostan took part in a first Anglo-Afghan war (1839–1842). During the British era, Bostan was a famous railway junction connecting Quetta with Zhob, Harnai and Chaman. Bostan and Zhob were connected by a narrow gauge railway track which was later dismantled around June 2008.

The total length of this railway from Bostan to Zhob was 294 km, which made it the longest Narrow gauge Railway of the subcontinent in 1920s. It had 11 stations in between including the famous Kan Mehtarzai station which was the highest station in Pakistan at an altitude of 2224 meters (7295 feet).
For a long part of its journey, the railway followed the Zhob River and thus it was called the Zhob Valley Railway (ZVR).

Chronology of Bostan Zhob Railway
 1916: Work started on Khanai – Hindubagh section of ZVR.
 1 January 1921: 74.7 km (46.12 mi) long Khanai to Hindubagh Narrow gauge track was completed
 2 May 1927: 62.93 km (38.85 mi) long Hindubagh to Qila Saifullah section of NG line was opened
 15 January 1929: 143.62 km (88.66 mi) long Qila Saifullah to Fort Sandeman (now called Zhob) section of NG line was opened. Only goods traffic started on this section on this date.
 15 July 1929: Passenger service started from Qila Saifullah to Fort Sandeman (now Zhob)
 Year 1932 Bostan Harnai track dismantled for political reasons.
 20 November 1939: 15.84 km (9.78 mi) long Khanai to Bostan Jn NG was opened
 1985: Bostan to Zhob Narrow Gauge line was closed down for passenger service
 1986: Bostan to Zhob Narrow Gauge line was closed down for freight service
 2007–08: Narrow gauge track was uprooted and auctioned off for roughly Rs 300 million

References 

Populated places in Pishin District